Peshat (also P'shat) is one of the two classic methods of Jewish biblical exegesis, the other being Derash. While Peshat is commonly defined as referring to the surface or literal (direct) meaning of a text, numerous scholars and rabbis have debated this for centuries, giving Peshat many uses and definitions.

Definitions 

Peshat is most often defined as "straight," in reference to its tendency to describe the meaning of the text apparent at face value, taking into account idiomatic expressions, and focusing mostly on literal interpretation. It is often considered the most straightforward method for reading and understanding of biblical text. In this way, Peshat differentiates itself from the other methods present in Pardes - Remez, Drash and Sod, which look at what may be hidden in the text.

Linguistically, the term Peshat finds its root in the Biblical Hebrew term meaning "to flatten out," or "to extend." In the Talmudic Era, this definition was expanded to mean "to propound." Often when defining Peshat, a quote from the Shabbat tractate of Talmud is referenced, stating "אין מקרא יוצא מידי פשוטו," or, "a text cannot be taken from the meaning of its peshat." Some have used the Talmudic definition of Peshat to widen its overall definition, stating that the Peshat interpretation of a particular passage is "the teaching recognized by the public as obviously authoritative, since familiar and traditional," or "the usual accepted traditional meaning as it was generally taught." Based on the definitions provided by Talmud, it may be inferred that Peshat is solely a literal exegetical method. Others, though, have attributed this line of thought to the work of Rashi, and that he strictly defined Peshat and Drash years later - often his definitions have been used to redact the meaning of Peshat within its Talmudic usage.

Another linguistic curiosity can be seen in the difference between Peshat and the Hebrew verb Lamad (למד), meaning "to study." Peshat can be interpreted to mean a thorough and intensive learning of a text, rather than just a surface reading signified by Lamad. In this understanding of Peshat, the idea that it is only the literal meaning of a text is incorrect. Rather, Peshat would refer to what can be extracted from intensive study, while still maintaining the importance of the literal meaning of the text. Therefore, a slightly different definition of Peshat can be formed, specifically that Peshat should refer to the meaning of a text as was commonly taught and accepted, including, but not limited to, a literal interpretation.

Definitions of Peshat also note the importance of context, both historical and literary. This is in contrast to Drash, which will often take the text of a verse out of its context, for uses beyond the context such as ritual or moral purposes. However, this does not mean that Peshat and Drash are fully opposing methods. In fact, one may often be used in helping to explain the other, in finding and defining nuances in text that might be otherwise inexplicable without application of both methods.

Rabbinic views and usage 

Abraham Ibn Ezra is quoted in his writings as saying that the rabbis of the Talmud were well-versed in Peshat, having built their Midrashic exegeses on it: "They [the talmudic rabbis] knew peshat better than all the generations that came after them." In contrast, Rashbam, felt that the early rabbis were not knowledgeable in Peshat, and instead used other strategies. Consequently, these rabbis were led to opposing conclusions of the rabbis' halachic exegesis: Rashbam understood this as a separate type of exegesis from Peshat, while Ibn Ezra felt that the only proper exegesis would lead to his own conclusions, and therefore disregarded the midrashim of the Talmudic rabbis as exegesis altogether. Regardless of these differences in opinion in reference to the rabbis of the Talmud, both Ibn Ezra and Rashbam favored and promoted Peshat as a superior alternative to Midrashic methods.

One of Rashbam's students, Rabbi Eliezer of Beaugency, is noted as completely removing Drash from his exegetical strategies, relying solely on Peshat. In comparison to Rashbam's tendency to explain how his views would contrast with those of talmudic rabbis, Rabbi Eliezer is not compelled to do so, feeling that Peshat is the only proper way to look at text. As Peshat's methods rely often on the importance of context, Rabbi Eliezer's commentaries are known for their tendency to focus on the context of a given verse or text. His commentaries are integrated with text, rather than sitting separate from them, and he insists on ensuring that no verse loses its context during his discussions, in comparison to other methods, such as the "verse-by-verse approach of Rashi"

David Kimhi (Radak) was also known for his ability in Peshat, and was influenced both by Ibn Ezra and Rashi. While Kimhi preferred Peshat methods over Derash, the influence of Rashi can be seen in some of his commentaries, in the inclusion of midrashic citations. Additionally, Kimhi lived among many famed proponents of Derash, such as Rabbi Moses the Preacher, who "undoubtedly had a substantial impact on Radak." Kimhi tended to go out of his way to reject the views of the rabbis of the Talmud often, which has led to the theory that, although disagreeing with them, Kimhi fully acknowledged the tradition and authority of the talmud rabbis. In his commentaries, Kimhi labels his interpretation as Peshat, and that of the talmudic rabbis as Derash, creating a strict divide between the two in his writings.

A student of Saadiah Gaon is recorded as saying: "This is the sign by which you should know which comments well and which comments badly: Any commentator who first comments with peshuto shel mikra in concise language, and afterwards brings some of our rabbis' midrash, this is a good commentary, and the reverse is [a] crude [commentary].

The modern approach of "Tanach at Eye Level" or "תנ"ך בגובה העיניים" led by Rabbi Yaakov Medan and Rabbi Dr. Yoel Bin-Nun, and promoted by many of the rabbis and alumni of Yeshivat Har Etzion is an approach to studying Tanach which in essence follows in the footsteps of the Rashbam, Iben Ezra and Radak in sticking more closely to the Peshat and straightforward way of understanding the Bible.

Talmudic examples 

Below are several examples of Peshat's usage in the Talmud:
 Rabbi Kahana objected to Mar son of R. Huna: But this refers to the words of the Torah? A verse cannot depart from its plain meaning (פשוטו), he replied. R. Kahana said: By the time I was eighteen years old I had studied the whole Talmud, yet I did not know that a verse cannot depart from its plain meaning (פשוטו) until today. What does he inform us? That a man should study and subsequently understand. 

 Others say: According to the rabbis no question arises, for since the text has once been torn away from its ordinary meaning (פשוטו) it must in all respects so remain.

 Said Raba: Although throughout the Torah no text loses its ordinary meaning (פשוטו), here the gezerah shawah has come and entirely deprived the text of its ordinary meaning (פשוטו).

See also 
 Rabbinic literature
 Torah study

References

Bibliography 
 Angel, Rabbi Hayyim. "From Black Fire to White Fire: Conversations about Religious Tanakh Methodology." The Institute for Jewish Ideas and Ideals. 4 Sept. 2008. Web. <http://www.jewishideas.org/articles/black-fire-white-fire-conversations-about-religious-tanakh-methodology-rabbi-hayyim-angel>.* Berger, Yitzhak. "The Contextual Exegesis of Rabbi Eliezer of Beaugency and the Climax of the Northern French Peshat Tradition." Jewish Studies Quarterly 15.2 (2008): 115-29. Print.
 Berger, Yitzhak. "Peshat and the Authority of Ḥazal in the Commentaries of Radak." Association for Jewish Studies Review 31.1 (2007): 41-59. Print.
 
 Garfinkel, Stephen. "Clearing Peshat and Derash." Hebrew Bible/Old Testament - The History of Its Interpretation. Comp. Chris Brekelmans and Menahem Haran. Ed. Magne Sæbø. Göttingen: Vandenhoeck & Ruprecht, 2000. 130-34. Print.
 Eran Viezel, ‘The Rise and Fall of Jewish Philological Exegesis on the Bible in the Middle Ages: Causes and Effects,’ Review of Rabbinic Judaism 20 (2017), pp. 48-88
 Eran Viezel, ‘On the Medieval Rabbinic Assumption that the Early Sages Knew the Peshat,’ Journal of Jewish Studies 70 (2019), pp. 256-275 
 Goldin, S. (2007). Unlocking the Torah Text: Bereishit. Gefen Publishing. 
 Lockshin, Martin I. "Lonely Man of Peshat." Jewish Quarterly Review 99.2 (2009): 291-300. Print.
 Rabinowitz, Louis. "The Talmudic Meaning of Peshat." Tradition: A Journal of Orthodox Thought 6.1 (1963). Web.
 

Biblical exegesis
Torah